This is a list of delegates of the 1st World Congress of the Communist International.  The founding congress that established the Communist International was held in Moscow from 2 March 1919 to 6 March 1919.

Full delegates

Russian Communist Party (Bolsheviks)
Six delegates shared five votes:

Vladimir Lenin
Leon Trotsky
Grigory Zinoviev
Joseph Stalin
Nikolai Bukharin
Georgy Chicherin

Communist Party of Germany
One delegate held five votes:

Hugo Eberlein

Socialist Labor Party of America
One delegate held five votes:

Boris Reinstein

Communist Party of German Austria
Two delegates shared three votes:

Karl Steinhardt
K. Petin

Balkan Revolutionary Social Democratic Federation
One delegate held three votes:

Christian Rakovsky

Communist Party of Finland
Five delegates shared three votes:

Yrjö Sirola
Kullervo Manner
Otto Kuusinen
Jukka Rahja
Eino Rahja

Communist Party of Hungary
One delegate held three votes:

Endre Rudnyánszky

Norwegian Labour Party
One delegate held three votes:

Emil Stang

Communist Party of Poland
One delegate held three votes:

Józef Unszlicht

Social Democratic Left Party of Sweden
One delegate held three votes:

Otto Grimlund

Swiss Social Democratic Party (Opposition)
One delegate held three votes:

Fritz Platten

Communist Party of Ukraine
Two delegate shared three votes:

N. A. Skrypnik
S. I. Gopner

Communist Party of Armenia
One delegate held a single vote:

Gurgen Haikun

United Group of the Eastern Peoples of Russia
Five delegates shared a single vote:

Mahomet Altimirov
Hussein Bekentayev
Kasim Kasimov
Burhan Mansurov
Gaziz Yalymov

Communist Party of Estonia
One delegate held a single vote:

Hans Pöögelmann

Zimmerwald Left of France
One delegate held a single vote:

Henri Guilbeaux

Communist Party of the German Colonists in Russia
One delegate held a single vote:

Gustav Klinger

Communist Party of Latvia
One delegate held a single vote:

Kārlis Gailis

Communist Party of Lithuania and Belorussia
One delegate held a single vote:

Consultative delegates

Russian Communist Party (Bolsheviks)
V. V. Obolensky
V. V. Vorovsky

Bulgarian Communist Group
Stojan Dyorov

Central Bureau of Eastern Peoples
Mir Jafar Baghirov (Azerbaijani Section)
Tengiz Zhgenti (Georgian Section)
Mirza Davud Bagir-Uglu Gusseinov (Persian Section)
Gaziz Yalymov (Turkestan Section)
Mustafa Suphi (Turkish Section)

Chinese Socialist Workers Party
Liu Shao-zhou
Zhang Yong-kui

Czech Communist Group
 Jaroslav Handlíř

French Communist Group
Jacques Sadoul

British Communist Group
Joseph Fineberg

Korean Workers League in Moscow
Kang Sang-ju

Dutch Social Democratic Group
Sebald Rutgers

Swiss Communist Group
Leonie Kascher

Socialist Propaganda League of America
Sebald Rutgers

Yugoslav Communist Group
Ilija Milkić

Zimmerwald Committee
Angelica Balabanova

References

See also
List of delegates of the 2nd Comintern congress

Comintern
1st Comintern congress